The Royal Aircraft Factory S.E.5 is a British biplane fighter aircraft of the First World War. It was developed at the Royal Aircraft Factory by a team consisting of Henry Folland, John Kenworthy and Major Frank Goodden. It was one of the fastest aircraft of the war, while being both stable and relatively manoeuvrable. According to aviation author Robert Jackson, the S.E.5 was: "the nimble fighter that has since been described as the 'Spitfire of World War One'".

In most respects the S.E.5 had superior performance to the rival Sopwith Camel, although it was less immediately responsive to the controls. Problems with its Hispano-Suiza engine, particularly the geared-output H-S 8B-powered early versions, meant that there was a chronic shortage of the type until well into 1918. Thus, while the first examples had reached the Western Front before the Camel, there were fewer squadrons equipped with the S.E.5 than with the Sopwith fighter.

Together with the Camel, the S.E.5 was instrumental in regaining allied air superiority in mid-1917 and maintaining it for the rest of the war, ensuring there was no repetition of "Bloody April" 1917 when losses in the Royal Flying Corps were much heavier than in the Luftstreitkräfte. The S.E.5s remained in RAF service for some time following the Armistice that ended the conflict; some were transferred to various overseas military operators, while a number were also adopted by civilian operators.

Development

Origins

The S.E.5 (Scout Experimental 5) was designed by Henry Folland, John Kenworthy and Major Frank Goodden of the Royal Aircraft Factory in Farnborough. It was built around the new 150 hp (112 kW) Hispano-Suiza 8, a V8 engine that, while providing excellent performance, was initially underdeveloped and unreliable. The first of three prototypes flew on 22 November 1916. The first two prototypes were lost in crashes (the first killing the chief test pilot at the Royal Aircraft Factory, Major Frank Goodden, on 28 January 1917) due to a weakness in their wing design. The third prototype underwent modification before production commenced; the S.E.5 was known in service as an exceptionally strong aircraft which could be dived at very high speed – the squarer wings also gave much improved lateral control at low airspeeds.

Like the other significant Royal Aircraft Factory aircraft of the war (B.E.2, F.E.2 and R.E.8) the S.E.5 was inherently stable, making it an excellent gunnery platform, but it was also quite manoeuvrable. It was one of the fastest aircraft of the war at 138 mph (222 km/h), equal at least in speed to the SPAD S.XIII and faster than any standard German type of the period. While the S.E.5 was not as agile and effective in a tight dogfight as the Camel it was much easier and safer to fly, particularly for novice pilots. According to "Dodge" Bailey, Chief Test Pilot of the Shuttleworth Collection, it had "somewhat similar handling characteristics to a de Havilland Tiger Moth, but with better excess power".

S.E.5a
Only 77 original S.E.5 aircraft had been completed prior to production settling upon an improved model, designated as the S.E.5a. The initial models of the S.E.5a differed from late production examples of the S.E.5 only in the type of engine installed – a geared 200 hp Hispano-Suiza 8b, often turning a large clockwise-rotation four-bladed propeller, replacing the 150 hp H.S. 8A model. In total 5,265 S.E.5s were constructed by six manufacturers: Austin Motors (1,650), Air Navigation and Engineering Company (560), Curtiss (1), Martinsyde (258), the Royal Aircraft Factory (200), Vickers (2,164) and Wolseley Motors Limited (431).

Shortly following the American entry into World War I, plans were mooted for several American aircraft manufacturers to commence mass production of aircraft already in service with the Allied powers, one such fighter being the S.E.5. In addition to an order of 38 Austin-built S.E.5a aircraft which were produced in Britain and assigned to the American Expeditionary Force to equip already-deployed US Army squadrons, the US Government issued multiple orders to the Curtiss Aeroplane and Motor Company for the manufacture and delivery of around 1,000 S.E.5s to be produced in the United States. However, only one Curtiss-built aircraft would be completed prior to the end of the conflict, after which demand for the S.E.5 had effectively evaporated, production being quickly halted after a further 56 aircraft were assembled using already-delivered components.

At first, airframe construction outstripped the very limited supply of French-built Hispano-Suiza engines and squadrons earmarked to receive the new fighter had to soldier on with Airco DH 5s and Nieuport 24s until early 1918. The troublesome geared "-8b" model was prone to have serious gear reduction system problems, sometimes with the propeller (and even the entire gearbox on a very few occasions) separating from the engine and airframe in flight, a problem shared with the similarly-powered Sopwith Dolphin. The introduction of the 200 hp (149 kW) Wolseley Viper, a high-compression, direct-drive version of the Hispano-Suiza 8a made under licence by Wolseley Motors Limited, solved the S.E.5a's engine problems and was promptly adopted as the type's standard powerplant. A number of aircraft were subsequently converted to a two-seat configuration in order to serve as trainer aircraft.

S.E.5b

The S.E.5b was a variant of the S.E.5 with a streamlined nose and upper and lower wings of different span and chord. The single example, a converted S.E.5a, first flew in early April 1918. It had a spinner on the propeller and a retractable underslung radiator. Its performance was little better than the S.E.5a, with the extra drag of the big upper wing offsetting gains from the more streamlined fuselage.  The S.E.5b was not considered for production. In January 1919, it was tested with standard S.E.5a wings and in this form survived as a research aircraft into the early twenties.

Design
The Royal Aircraft Factory S.E.5 was a conventional tractor biplane fighter aircraft. The fuselage was a wire-braced box girder structure while the wings were furnished with wooden spars and internal ribs. The fuselage was narrower than many contemporary aircraft, which provided the pilot with good all-round visibility. The aircraft had considerable structural strength, which was credited with improving the type's crashworthiness and survivability. It could also withstand high-g manoeuvres and was relatively resistant to battle-damage.

Unlike many of its peers, which were highly agile but unforgiving, the S.E.5 was comparatively stable and easy to fly; its stability enabling pilots to more readily fire upon enemies from further away with a greater degree of accuracy. It had a noticeably lower accident rate than comparable aircraft. The exception to its generally stability was an excessive amount of adverse yaw. The yaw could be compensated for by balanced application of the aileron and rudder, whilst adjustment of the elevator trim made it possible to fly in a 'hands off' manner.  

The S.E.5 was powered by various engines, initially adopting a Hispano-Suiza 8 V8 engine. The Hispano-Suiza engine was advanced for the era, incorporating such features as an aluminium cylinder block with steel liners, dual ignition and forced lubrication that aided cooling; especially compared with contemporary rotary engines, it had the advantage of being easy to operate by most pilots. An expansion tank for the cooling system was integrated into the leading edge of the upper wing's centre section. One of its greatest advantages over the Sopwith Camel was its superior performance at altitude, making it a much better match for the Fokker D.VII when that fighter arrived at the front.

The S.E.5 was armed with a single synchronised .303-inch Vickers machine gun in contrast to the Camel's two, but it also had a wing-mounted Lewis gun fitted on a Foster mounting, which enabled the pilot to fire at an enemy aircraft from below. This armament configuration was much appreciated by the pilots of the first S.E.5 squadrons as the new hydraulic-link "C.C." synchronising gear for the Vickers machine gun was unreliable at first. The Vickers gun was mounted on the forward left dorsal surface of the fuselage with the breech inside the cockpit, at a slight upwards angle. Typically, spare magazines for the Lewis gun would have been placed within most of the free space in the cockpit including the forward areas, such as the instrumentation panel.

The standard instrument panel included a compass, altimeter, tachometer, oil pressure indicator, airspeed gauge, radiator temperature dial, fuel air pressure indicator, fuel selector, and air exchange; these were somewhat difficult to view due to their low-set position in the cockpit. According to "Dodge" Bailey, Chief Test Pilot of the Shuttleworth Collection, the S.E.5's cockpit was "the best of the bunch from the era". It was set amidships, making it difficult to see over the long front fuselage, but otherwise visibility was good. 

Individual in-service S.E.5s would often receive customisations and user-specified tweaks at the request of their pilots. Popular changes included reducing the dihedral of the wings in order to increase its manoeuvrability and the removal of the head fairing to increase the pilot's visibility to the rear. James McCudden, an ace pilot and former RFC mechanic, was famous for his prolific fine-tuning of his aircraft in order to produce improved performance from it; McCudden was able to increase the top speed by 9 mph and to raise the service ceiling from the standard 17,000 ft to 20,000 ft. His adaptions included replacing the standard pistons with high compression versions, shortening the exhaust (saving weight and improving exhaust scavenging), and changes to mixture, ignition and other engine settings as well as fitting a salvaged German propeller spinner (which he himself credited as gaining 3 mph alone).

Aviation authors Donald Nijboer and Dan Patterson describe the S.E.5 as "arguably the best British-built fighter of World War I".

Operational history

In March 1917, the S.E.5 entered service with No. 56 Squadron RFC, although the squadron did not deploy to the Western Front until the following month. Everyone was suspicious of the large "greenhouse" windscreens fitted to the first production models. These were designed to protect the pilot in his unusually high seating position, which was in turn intended to improve vision over the upper wing. The squadron did not fly its first patrol with the S.E.5 until 22 April, by which time, on the insistence of Major Blomfield, 56 squadron's commanding officer, all aircraft had been fitted with small rectangular screens of conventional design. The problem of the high seating position was solved by simply lowering it, pilots in any case preferring a more conventional (and comfortable) seating position. No complaints seem to have been made about the view from the cockpit; in fact, this was often cited as one of the strong points of the type.

While pilots, some of whom were initially disappointed with the S.E.5, quickly came to appreciate its strength and fine flying qualities, it was popularly judged to have been underpowered; this failing was addressed by the introduction of the more powerful S.E.5a. In June 1917, the S.E.5a entered service and quickly began to replace the S.E.5. At this time 56 Squadron was still the only unit flying the new fighter; in fact it was the only operational unit to be fully equipped with the initial 150 hp S.E.5 – all other S.E.5 squadrons officially used the 200 hp S.E.5a from the outset – although a few S.E.5s were issued to other squadrons due to an acute shortage of the S.E.5a. Deliveries of the S.E.5a suffered from delays due to a shortage of available engines with which to power the type.

Due to the shortage of aircraft, there was a very slow initial build-up of new S.E.5a squadrons, which lasted well into 1918. Once the Wolseley Viper-powered model became plentiful, many more units were re-equipped with the type. By the end of the war, the S.E.5a was employed by a total of 21 British Empire squadrons as well as two U.S. units. Many of the top Allied aces of the Great War flew this fighter, including Billy Bishop, Andrew Beauchamp-Proctor, Edward Mannock and James McCudden. Legendary British ace Albert Ball was initially disparaging of the S.E.5, but in the end claimed 11 of his 44 victories flying it. McCudden wrote of the S.E.5: "It was very fine to be in a machine that was faster than the Huns, and to know that one could run away just as things got too hot."

Sholto Douglas who commanded No. 84 Squadron RFC which was initially equipped with the S.E.5a, listed the type's qualities as being: "Comfortable, with a good all-round view, retaining its performance and manoeuvrability at high level, steady and quick to gather speed in the dive, capable of a very fine zoom, useful in both offence and defence, strong in design and construction, [and] possessing a reliable engine".

Soon after the Armistice the S.E.5a was withdrawn from RAF service. It was retained for a time in Canada, and in 1921 a Viper-engined S.E.5a was taken to Japan by the British Aviation Mission to the Imperial Japanese Navy.

Australia received 35 S.E.5a under the Imperial Gift in 1919, and the type went on to be the newly formed R.A.A.F.’s main fighter type until the late 1920’s.

A number of machines found roles in civilian flying after the war. On 30 May 1922, the first use of skywriting for advertising occurred when Cyril Turner, a former RAF officer, spelt out "London Daily Mail" in black smoke from an S.E.5a at The Derby. Others were used for air racing; one such privately owned aircraft won the Morris Cup race in 1927.

Variants
S.E.5
 First production version. Single-seat fighter biplane, powered by a 150 hp (112 kW) Hispano-Suiza 8a piston engine.
S.E.5a
 Improved production version, powered by a 200 hp (149 kW) Hispano-Suiza 8B, 8Ba or 8Bb V-8 (early version) or 200 hp (149 kW) Wolseley Viper piston engine.
S.E.5b
 Experimental prototype, with sesquiplane wings, streamlined nose and retractable radiator.
Eberhart S.E.5e
 S.E.5a assembled from spare parts by American company Eberhart Aeroplane, 180 hp Wright-Hispano E engine and plywood-covered fuselages, about 60 built.
T.E.1
 Drawings for a two seat fighter described as "based on a scaled-up S.E.5" were prepared early in 1917 - the type was to have had a 31-foot 3-inch wingspan, 200 hp Hispano-Suiza 8 engine, and to have been armed with a single forward firing Vickers and a Scarff mounted Lewis for the observer. Six examples ordered (A 8951 - A 8956) but because of the success of the Bristol fighter, and in view of the shortage of Hispano-Suiza engines, none was ever completed.

Operators
Argentina
 Argentine Navy – One SE.5a aircraft, in service from 1926 – 1929.
Australia
 Australian Flying Corps/Royal Australian Air Force
World War I
 No. 2 Squadron AFC in France.
 No. 5 (Training) Squadron AFC in the United Kingdom.
 No. 6 (Training) Squadron AFC – One aircraft only.
Post-war
 No. 1 Squadron RAAF
 No. 3 Squadron RAAF
 No. 1 Flying Training School RAAF
Brazil
 Aviação Militar (Brazilian Army Aviation) – One SE.5a aircraft, donated by Handley Page, in service during 1920.
Canada
 Canadian Air Force
 Royal Canadian Air Force
Chile
 Chilean Air Force
Ireland
 Irish Air Service
 Irish Air Corps
Poland
 Polish Air Force
 Polish 7th Air Escadrille operated one S.E.5a in 1920, during the Polish-Soviet war
South Africa
 South African Air Force
United Kingdom
 Royal Flying Corps/Royal Air Force

 No. 1 Squadron RAF
 No. 17 Squadron RAF
 No. 24 Squadron RAF
 No. 29 Squadron RAF
 No. 30 Squadron RAF
 No. 32 Squadron RAF
 No. 40 Squadron RAF
 No. 41 Squadron RAF
 No. 47 Squadron RAF
 No. 50 Squadron RAF
 No. 56 Squadron RAF
 No. 60 Squadron RAF
 No. 61 Squadron RAF
 No. 64 Squadron RAF
 No. 68 Squadron RAF
 No. 72 Squadron RAF
 No. 74 Squadron RAF
 No. 78 Squadron RAF
 No. 81 Squadron RAF
 No. 84 Squadron RAF
 No. 85 Squadron RAF
 No. 87 Squadron RAF
 No. 92 Squadron RAF
 No. 93 Squadron RAF
 No. 94 Squadron RAF
 No. 111 Squadron RAF
 No. 143 Squadron RAF
 No. 145 Squadron RAF
 No. 150 Squadron RAF
 No. 229 Squadron RAF

United States
 Air Service of the American Expeditionary Force
 25th Aero Squadron (November 1918)
 United States Navy

Surviving aircraft and replicas

Originals

An original S.E.5a may be seen at the Shuttleworth Collection at Old Warden, England, UK. This aircraft was originally serial F904 of No. 84 Squadron RAF, then flew as G-EBIA from September 1923 to February 1932. It was stored between 1933 and 1955, before being restored to a flightworthy condition by staff at the Royal Aircraft Establishment and then passed onto the Shuttleworth Collection. An extensive refurbishment of this aircraft was performed in 2007. It has been re-registered as G-EBIA, it was first painted as D7000, then as F904.

An original S.E.5e may be seen in the National Museum of the United States Air Force at Dayton, Ohio, USA. The museum acquired the S.E.5e through a donation by the estate of Lt. Col. William C. Lambert, USAF Ret, a First World War ace with 21.5 victories. Lambert flew the S.E.5a as an American member of the Royal Flying Corps and the Royal Air Force. The Air Force Museum Foundation also helped buy the aircraft. It is painted to represent an S.E.5e of the 18th Headquarters Squadron, Bolling Field, Washington, D.C., in 1925.

Another four original airframes are statically displayed at: the Science Museum, London, UK; Royal Air Force Museum, London, UK; South African National Museum of Military History, Johannesburg, South Africa; and the Australian War Memorial, Canberra, Australia.

Reproductions

Two full-scale replica S.E.5a aircraft were built by Miles Aircraft in 1965 for use in film making and were transferred to the Irish civil aircraft register in 1967 while the two were employed in flying scenes for the 1966 war movie The Blue Max.

Three flightworthy reproductions (designated SE5a-1), along with a single static example, were constructed by The Vintage Aviator Limited in New Zealand. According to the group, the reproduction aircraft, which was the company's first project, combined some authentic components, such as the Hispano engines used, with newly-fabricated parts based on original archived drawings.

The Museum of Flight in Seattle, Washington, US displays the reproduction SE.5a that Bobby Strahlman and his partners completed for collector Doug Champlin in 1989. This reproduction features one .303 Vickers and one .303-calibre Lewis machine gun, and carries the paint scheme of American ace George Vaughn who served with the Royal Flying Corps. The SE.5 was displayed at Champlin's fighter museum at Mesa, Arizona, US until the collection was transferred to Seattle in 2003.

Fictional portrayals

The Royal Aircraft Factory S.E.5 has been portrayed, both by original and replica aircraft, in various movies. These include Wings (1927), Hell's Angels (1930), Flying Down to Rio (1933), Crimson Romance (1934), Test Pilot (1939) and The Aviator (2004). Converted Stampe et Vertongen SV.4 trainer/tourer aircraft were used to portray S.E.5s in the 1976 Anglo-French production Aces High.

The 1971 film Zeppelin makes reference to the use of the S.E.5 as a weapon to defend against the German Zeppelins that were attacking Britain during the First World War. The film, however, is set in the fall of 1915, a full year-and-a-half before the S.E. 5 entered squadron service. The dogfight scene near the film's conclusion features S.E.5a replicas.

Specifications (S.E.5a)

See also

Notable S.E.5 pilots
 Albert Ball, VC, DSO and two bars, MC
 Mick Mannock, VC, DSO & two Bars, MC & Bar
 James McCudden, VC, DSO & Bar, MC & Bar, MM
 Andrew Beauchamp-Proctor, VC, DSO, MC and bar, DFC
 Cecil Lewis, MC
Thomas Herbert, British Distinguished Flying Cross & American Distinguished Service Cross. Future Ohio Attorney General, Governor of Ohio, and Ohio Supreme Court Justice.

References

Notes

Citations

Bibliography

 Beck, Simon D. The Aircraft-Spotter's Film and Television Companion. McFarland, 2016. .
 Bruce, J.M. "The S.E.5: Historic Military Aircraft No. 5". Flight, 17 July 1953. pp. 85–89, 93.
 Bruce, J.M. "The S.E.5A". Aircraft in Profile, Volume 1/Part1. Windsor, Berkshire, UK: Profile Publications Ltd., 1965 (Revised 4th edition 1975). .
 Cheesman. Fighter Aircraft of the 1914–1918 War. Letchworth:Harleyford, 1960.
 Franks, Norman L.R. SE 5/5a Aces of World War 1. Botley, Oxford, UK: Osprey Publications, 2007. .
 Hare, Paul R. "Mount of Aces – The Royal Aircraft Factory S.E.5a". Stroud, UK: Fonthill Media, 2013. 
 Hare, Paul R. The Royal Aircraft Factory. London:Putnam, 1990. .
 Jackson, Robert. Britain's Greatest Aircraft. Pen and Sword, 2007. .
 Kopański, Tomasz Jan. Samoloty brytyjskie w lotnictwie polskim 1918–1930 (British Aircraft in the Polish Air Force 1918–1930)(in Polish). Warsaw: Bellona, 2001. .
 McCudden, James Flying Fury: Five Years in the Royal Flying Corps. London:Greenhill, 2000 (reprint of 1919 edition). .
 Mortimer, Gavin. The First Eagles: The Fearless American Aces Who Flew with the RAF in World War I. Voyageur Press, 2014. .
 Nijboer, Donald and Dan Patterson. Fighting Cockpits: In the Pilot's Seat of Great Military Aircraft from World War I to Today. Voyageur Press, 2016. .
 Sturtivant, Ray ISO and Gordon Page. The SE5 File. Tunbridge Wells, Kent, UK: Air-Britain (Historians) Ltd., 1996. .

External links

 "Walkaround of the SE.5a." – Image gallery of the S.E.5a Reproduction Project at The Vintage Aviator Ltd, New Zealand.
 "History of the SE.5a." – Article on the history of the S.E.5a written by The Vintage Aviator Ltd, New Zealand.
 "The English S.E.V.A. Single-Seater Fighter" – Contemporary German report (in Deutsche Luftfahrer Zeitschrift) on the SE.5 translated for Flight
 Video of S.E. 5a reproduction with WW I-vintage Wright-Hispano V8 engine, being built in Texas

1910s British fighter aircraft
Military aircraft of World War I
SE05
Biplanes
Single-engined tractor aircraft
Aircraft first flown in 1916